Happy Little Submarines 4: Adventure of Octopus (Chinese: 潜艇总动员4：章鱼奇遇记) is a 2014 Chinese animated adventure comedy film directed by James Hol.

Cast
Jiang Ke
Wang Xiaotong
Li Ye

Reception
The film has grossed US$7.39 million at the Chinese box office.

See also
Happy Little Submarine Magic Box of Time (2015)

References

2010s adventure comedy films
2014 animated films
2014 films
Animated adventure films
Animated comedy films
Chinese animated films
2014 comedy films